Pent Nurmekund (16 December 190628 December 1996) was an Estonian linguist and polyglot. He could read over eighty languages.

Life
Nurmekund came from a poor peasant family and first attended school at the age of twelve.

From 1930 to 1935, he studied Romance and Germanic philology at Tartu University, and graduated with a Magister Philosophiae.

In 1935, he became a founding member of the Estonian Oriental Society.

From 1955 to 1986, he was a lecturer at Tartu University, and in the 1950s founded the Oriental department there.

In 1991, he received the Wiedemann Language Award.

References

1906 births
1996 deaths
20th-century linguists
Academic staff of the University of Tartu
Linguists from Estonia
Multilingualism
People from Saarde Parish
University of Tartu alumni